Taai or Taʻai is a surname. Notable people with the surname include:
 Angelique Taai (born 1987), South African cricketer and coach
 Ukuma Taʻai (born 1987), Tongan rugby league footballer